Elton Moncrieff (born ) is a New Zealand former rugby union footballer. His regular playing position was scrum-half. He played for Wellington in the NPC and for the Reds and Crusaders in the Super 12 competition. He moved to England in 1999 to play for Gloucester, and later played for Worcester Warriors. He attended St Patrick's College, Wellington.

References

External links 
 ESPNscrum Profile

Living people
1972 births
New Zealand rugby union players
Rugby union scrum-halves
Queensland Reds players
Crusaders (rugby union) players
Wellington rugby union players
Gloucester Rugby players
Worcester Warriors players
People educated at St. Patrick's College, Wellington
Rugby union players from Wellington City